Matej Podstavek (born 21 February 1991) is a Slovak footballer who plays as a centre-back for Slovak club FC Lokomotíva Košice.

Club career
He made his debut for Dukla Banská Bystrica against Žlina (2–2) on 16 September 2012.

References

External links
 Corgoň Liga profile
 

1991 births
Living people
Slovak footballers
Slovak expatriate footballers
Association football central defenders
Sportspeople from Brezno
ŠK Kremnička players
FK Dukla Banská Bystrica players
FC Fredericia players
Thisted FC players
SK Dynamo České Budějovice players
Al Ansar FC players
Matej Podstavek
FK Železiarne Podbrezová players
FC Lokomotíva Košice players
Slovak Super Liga players
Czech First League players
Danish 1st Division players
Lebanese Premier League players
Slovak expatriate sportspeople in the Czech Republic
Slovak expatriate sportspeople in Lebanon
Slovak expatriate sportspeople in Denmark
Slovak expatriate sportspeople in Thailand
Expatriate footballers in the Czech Republic
Expatriate footballers in Lebanon
Expatriate men's footballers in Denmark
Expatriate footballers in Thailand